New York's 61st State Assembly district is one of 150 districts of the New York State Assembly.  it is represented by Assemblymember Charles Fall (D).

Geography

Prior to 2021, the district included neighborhoods in Staten Island's North Shore. Following redistricting in 2021, the district expanded to include Manhattan's Financial District, Battery Park City and the shoreline of Brooklyn between Brooklyn Heights and Bay Ridge.

Recent election results

2022

2020

2018

2016

2014

2012

2010

Past Assemblypersons
 Charles Fall (2019–present)
 Matthew Titone (2007–2018)
 John W. Lavelle (2003–2007)
 Robert Straniere (1993–2002)
 Deborah Glick (1991–1992)
 William F. Passannante (1983–1990)
 Elizabeth Connelly (1974–1982)
 Edward J. Amann, Jr. (1973–1974)
 Anthony G. DiFalco (1969–1972)
 Jerome W. Marks (1967–1968)
 James H. Tully, Jr. (1966)

References

61
Staten Island